David Laurence Frost (born 11 September 1959) is a South African professional golfer who was ranked in the top 10 of the Official World Golf Ranking in the late 1980s and early 1990s. Frost has 29 professional tournament wins to his name, spread across four continents, including the World Series of Golf, South African Open, Nedbank Million Dollar Challenge and Canadian Open. He has also been on the winning Alfred Dunhill Cup team and played in the Presidents Cup.

Early life 
Frost was born in Cape Town, South Africa and matriculated at Paarl Boys' High School in 1977. He used to be a cigarette salesman.

Professional career 
He turned professional in 1981. He scored his first professional win in his home country in 1983 and has continued to play in South Africa in the northern winter, but like other leading South African golfers he has spent far more time playing internationally. In line with many other Commonwealth golfers his first move abroad was to the European Tour and he played that tour from 1982 to 1984.

From 1985 he was primarily on the U.S.-based PGA Tour, where he went on to win ten tournaments, the most prestigious of which was the 1989 NEC World Series of Golf which he won by defeating Ben Crenshaw at the second playoff hole. He made the top ten on the PGA Tour money list twice, placing 9th in 1988 and 5th in 1993 and was ranked in the top 10 of the Official World Golf Rankings for 86 weeks between 1988 and 1994. By his forties, he was no longer a regular contender on the tour, but in 2005 he set the all time PGA Tour 72-hole putting record with 92 putts at the MCI Heritage while finishing only tied 38th.

Since 2007 Frost re-established his career on the European Tour aiming on the senior tour when turning 50.

In June 2013, Frost won his maiden senior major championship at the 2013 Regions Tradition. He won by a single stroke over Fred Couples to claim his first major title in his 17th attempt. It was also his fifth career victory on the Champions Tour. In March 2015, Frost won his sixth Champions Tour title at the Mississippi Gulf Resort Classic by a single stroke over Tom Lehman and Kevin Sutherland.

Frost won the Sunshine Tour Order of Merit in 1998/99. He was a member of the International Team in the first staging of the Presidents Cup in 1994, and took part again in 1996. In both 1997 and 1998 he captained South Africa to victory in the Alfred Dunhill Cup at the Old Course in St Andrews, Scotland. His teammates were Ernie Els and Retief Goosen on both occasions.

Private life 
The son of a vintner himself, Frost owns a winery in the Western Cape, South Africa, which produces vintages named after golf legends such as Jack Nicklaus and Arnold Palmer.

Professional wins (29)

PGA Tour wins (10)

PGA Tour playoff record (2–3)

European Tour wins (2)

1Co-sanctioned by the Sunshine Tour

European Tour playoff record (0–1)

Japan Golf Tour wins (1)

Japan Golf Tour playoff record (1–0)

Sunshine Tour wins (5)

1Co-sanctioned by the European Tour

Sunshine Tour playoff record (0–1)

Asia Golf Circuit wins (1)

Other wins (3)

Other playoff record (0–1)

Champions Tour wins (6)

Champions Tour playoff record (1–2)

European Senior Tour wins (2)

European Senior Tour playoff record (1–1)

Results in major championships

CUT = missed the half-way cut
"T" = tied

Summary

Most consecutive cuts made – 6 (1986 PGA – 1988 Masters)
Longest streak of top-10s – 3 (1987 Open Championship – 1988 Masters)

Results in The Players Championship

CUT = missed the halfway cut
WD = withdrew
"T" indicates a tie for a place

Results in World Golf Championships

"T" = Tied

Senior major championships

Wins (1)

Results timeline
Results not in chronological order before 2022.

CUT = missed the halfway cut
WD = withdrew
DQ = disqualified
"T" indicates a tie for a place
NT = No tournament due to COVID-19 pandemic

Team appearances
Professional
Hennessy Cognac Cup (representing the Rest of the World): 1984
Alfred Dunhill Cup (representing South Africa): 1991, 1992, 1993, 1994, 1995, 1997 (winners), 1998 (winners), 1999, 2000
Presidents Cup (International Team): 1994, 1996
World Cup (representing South Africa): 1998, 1999
Alfred Dunhill Challenge (representing Southern Africa): 1995 (winners)

See also
1984 PGA Tour Qualifying School graduates

References

External links

David Frost Wines

South African male golfers
PGA Tour golfers
European Tour golfers
Sunshine Tour golfers
PGA Tour Champions golfers
European Senior Tour golfers
Winners of senior major golf championships
Sportspeople from Cape Town
Alumni of Paarl Boys' High School
South African people of British descent
1959 births
Living people